is a Japanese journalist and newscaster, who works for NHK Radio 1.

Sueda was a presenter on the Ohayo Nippon morning show between 2000 and 2003, presented the Ogenki desu ka Nippon Retto afternoon program between 2004 and 2005, and was the weekend presenter on NHK News 7. As of December 2012, he presents the radio program .

References

1951 births
Living people
NHK
Japanese journalists
Japanese radio personalities
Japanese television presenters
People from Kure, Hiroshima
Japanese broadcast news analysts